Portrait of Ambroise Vollard with a Cat is an oil-on-canvas painting by the French artist Pierre Bonnard, executed c. 1924. It is housed now in the Petit Palais in Paris. Bonnard often painted its subject, the art dealer Ambroise Vollard.

References

Paintings in the collection of the Petit Palais
1924 paintings
Paintings by Pierre Bonnard
Portraits of men
20th-century portraits
Cats in art